The Rheinsender (Rhine transmitter) is a large medium-wave transmission facility near Wolfsheim, southwest of Mainz for the frequency 1017 kHz. The Rhine transmitter was established in 1950 and went on the air May 15, 1950. It belongs to SWR (until 1998 to SWF) and transmitted until the middle of the 1990s with 600 kilowatts. In the last years the transmission power was reduced to 100 kilowatts.

From 1950 to 2003 two 150-metre-high guyed steel tube masts were used as the transmission aerial, which are insulated from ground and which were separated by an insulator in the mast construction electrically in two parts for double feeding as fade reducing aerial. By the usage of two masts a direction minimum toward the southeast was obtained according to international regulations when working with a transmission power of 600 kilowatts at nighttime.

Furthermore, there is a 114-metre-tall guyed steel tube mast, which is also insulated against ground. This mast, which is used as reserve antenna for medium wave broadcasting, has an FM-transmission antenna on its top. Furthermore, there is also a free-standing grounded lattice tower used for radio services in UHF/VHF-ranges.

After transmission power was reduced to 100 kilowatts a direction minimum toward the southeast was no longer necessary and running the transmitter with omnidirectional radiation was possible.
Hence the second radio mast was obsolete and was demolished on February 26, 2003. On the remaining radio mast of the Rhine transmitter there are also aerials for FM broadcasting for SWR 4 on 94.9 MHz.

At the site of the demolished radio mast, a further grounded free-standing lattice tower was built in 2003. On this tower in 2004 a cage antenna was installed, which is used for broadcasting the SWR program "Das Ding" in the DRM-mode on 1485 kHz with an output power on 1 kW.

See also
 List of masts

External links
 
 
 http://www.skyscraperpage.com/diagrams/?b45794
 http://www.skyscraperpage.com/diagrams/?b46683
 http://www.skyscraperpage.com/diagrams/?b46684
 https://web.archive.org/web/20080320144112/http://www.waniewski.de/id382.htm

Radio masts and towers in Germany
Towers completed in 1950
1950 establishments in West Germany
Buildings and structures in Mainz-Bingen